Tilton is a given name and a surname. It may refer to:

Given name 
Ebenezer Tilton Moseley (1844–1898), Canadian lawyer and politician
Edith Tilton Penrose (1914–1996), American-born British economist, author, and professor
Henry Tilton Gorrell (1911–1958), American war correspondent
John Tilton Hack (1913–1991), American geologist and geomorphologist
Tilton E. Doolittle (1825–1896), American attorney and politician

Surname 
Alfred Tilton (1897–1942), Latvian-born Soviet Military Intelligence (GRU) chief, spy, and recruiter
Alice Tilton ( Phoebe Atwood Taylor; 1909–1976), American mystery author
Cathy Tilton (born ?), American politician and real estate broker
Charlene Tilton (born 1958), American actor and singer
Chris Tilton (born 1979), American soundtrack composer
Daniel Tilton (1763–1830), American territorial judge
Edward Lippincott Tilton (1861–1933), American architect
Edwin B. Tilton (1859–1926), American silent movie-era actor
Elizabeth Richards Tilton (1834–1897), American suffragist and newspaper poetry editor; wife of Theodore Tilton
Frances Tilton Weaver (1904–2003), American attorney
Franklin T. Tilton (born ?), American politician
Frederic W. Tilton (1839–1913), American educator and administrator
George Tilton (1923–2010), American geochemist
George Fred Tilton (1861–1932), American master mariner, whaler, storyteller, and author
Glenn Tilton (born 1948), American airline and oil executive
Henry R. Tilton (1836–1906), American army surgeon and cavalry officer
Hezekiah C. Tilton (1818–1879), American Methodist clergyman, army medic, and politician
Jack Tilton (1951–2017), American art dealer
James Tilton (1745–1822), American physician, soldier, and army surgeon general
James Tilton (surveyor) (1819–1878), American soldier, politician; first Surveyor General of the Washington Territory
John Rollin Tilton (1828–1888), American-born Italian painter
Liz Tilton (1918–2003), American singer; sister of Martha Tilton
Lois Tilton (born 1946), American novelist and short story writer
Lydia H. Tilton (1839–1915), American journalist and temperance activist
Lynn Tilton (born 1959), American business executive, corporate raider, investment banker, and stock trader
Mark Tilton (born 1962), British screenwriter, filmmaker, and musician
Martha Tilton (1915–2006), American singer and actor; sister of Liz Tilton
Nathaniel Tilton (born 1972), American blackjack player, author, and financial planner
Robert Tilton (born 1946), American televangelist
Roberta Elizabeth Odell Tilton (1837–1925), American-born Canadian social reformer and temperance activist
Roger Tilton (1924–2011), American filmmaker and documentarian
Ron Tilton (born 1963), American football player
Shane Tilton (born ?), American journalism professor, writer, and media theorist
Theodore Tilton (1835–1907), American newspaper editor, poet, and abolitionist; husband of Elizabeth Richards Tilton
William Tilton (1834–1910), American Civil War soldier
William S. Tilton (1828–1889), American businessman and soldier

In fiction 
Maggie Tilton, character in two books in the Lonesome Dove series
Press Tilton, character in The Pendragon Adventure book series